Gurleen Grewal is an Indian actress, supermodel, and an beauty pageant winner of Miss Diva, which is part of Femina Miss India. She won the title of Miss Diva International in 2013 and represented India in Miss International in Tokyo in the same year.  Gurleen has done various fashion events and walked the ramp for Bridal Fashion Week and for Lakme Fashion Week.

Miss Diva - 2013
She participated in first edition of Miss Diva - 2013 and was declared 1st Runner-up. She represented India at Miss International 2013 in Tokyo where she won the second place at the Miss Internet poll.

References 

Indian people
Punjabi people
Indian women
Female models from Punjab, India
Miss International 2013 delegates
Apeejay School alumni
1982 births
Living people